Iredalea inclinata is a species of sea snail, a marine gastropod mollusk in the family Drilliidae.

Description
The size of an adult shell is moderately large and varies between 16 mm and 25 mm. The 9 teleoconch whorls contain 12–15 ribs.

Distribution
This species occurs in the demersal zone of the Indo-Pacific off Southeast Africa, Mozambique, Madagascar, Mauritius and Réunion .

References

 Sowerby G.B. III 1893, Descriptions of fifteen new species of shells of the family Pleurotomidae. Proc. zool. Soc. Lond. 1893: 487–492
 Steyn, D.G. & Lussi, M. (1998) Marine Shells of South Africa. An Illustrated Collector's Guide to Beached Shells. Ekogilde Publishers, Hartebeespoort, South Africa, ii + 264 pp.
  Tucker, J.K. 2004 Catalog of recent and fossil turrids (Mollusca: Gastropoda). Zootaxa 682:1–1295

External links

 

inclinata
Gastropods described in 1893